Frédéric Jardin (born 18 May 1968) is a French film director.

Filmography

References

External links

Living people
1968 births
French film directors